Plectodonta is an extinct genus of brachiopods which existed during the Devonian to Silurian of the United States, Australia, Canada, China, the Czech Republic, Czechoslovakia, Germany, Kazakhstan, Morocco, Poland, Spain, Ukraine, Argentina, Bolivia, Sweden, the United Kingdom, and Venezuela. It was described by Kozlowski in 1929, and the type species is P. mariae. A new extinct subspecies, P. mariae pantherae, was described by Andrzej Baliński in 2012, from the early Devonian of Ukraine.

Species
 Plectodonta bipartita Chapman, 1913
 Plectodonta mariae Kozlowski, 1929
 Plectodonta mariae pantherae Baliński, 2012
 Plectodonta biplex
 Plectodonta minor
 Plectodonta millinensis
 Plectodonta heterosinus
 Plectodonta mimica (Barrande 1879)
 Plectodonta minima
 Plectodonta orientalis
 Plectodonta comitans
 Plectodonta subcomitans
 Plectodonta transversalis
 Plectodonta bidecorata

References

External links
 Plectodonta at the Paleobiology Database

Prehistoric brachiopod genera
Paleontology in New Hampshire
Paleozoic life of Ontario
Paleozoic life of New Brunswick
Paleozoic life of the Northwest Territories
Paleozoic life of Quebec
Paleozoic life of Yukon